The 2022–23 season is CS Universitatea Craiova's ninth consecutive and 37th overall season in Liga I. In addition to the Liga I, Universitatea will participate in this season's edition of the Cupa României and of the Europa Conference League.

Players

Squad information
Players, appearances, goals and squad numbers last updated on 30 June 2022. Appearances and goals include league matches only.Note: Flags indicate national team as has been defined under FIFA eligibility rules. Players may hold more than one non-FIFA nationality.

Transfers

In

Out

Club

Kit
Supplier: Puma / Sponsors: Betano (front)

The club is in the third year of a deal with Puma – the club's official kit supplier.

Home: The home kit features thick blue and white vertical stripes separated by thin black stripes. White shorts and blue socks complete the look.
Away:

Liga I
The draw for Liga I was held on the 1st of July.

UEFA Europa Conferance League

References

CS Universitatea Craiova seasons
Craiova, Universitatea, CS
Universitatea Craiova